The Chinese Wall is a large escarpment located in the Bob Marshall Wilderness Area in Montana. While definitions of the length of the wall vary (to up to forty miles) the part of the wall that is most well defined and continuous is about twelve miles long. The Chinese Wall makes up part of the Continental Divide, meaning water on the different sides of the wall flow into either the Atlantic Ocean (through the Gulf of Mexico) or the Pacific Ocean.

Access 
The wall is most commonly accessed through Benchmark Trailhead. It normally takes hikers multiple days to reach the wall which is located about 18 miles from the earlier trailhead. The Continental Divide Trail passes directly below the wall.

There is a camping ban in place directly along the wall to maintain the relatively fragile ecosystem from overuse.

References

Cliffs of the United States